Detti is an Italian surname. Notable people with the surname include:

Cesare Agostino Detti (1847–1914), Italian painter
Gabriele Detti (born 1994), Italian competitive swimmer

Italian-language surnames